Khosravi (also Romanized as Khosravī and Khusrawi) is a village in Arabkhaneh Rural District, Shusef District, Nehbandan County, South Khorasan Province, Iran. At the 2006 census, its population was 34, in 11 families. alireza moradi

References 

Populated places in Nehbandan County